Aramís is a Mexican luchador enmascarado (masked professional wrestler) currently working with Lucha Libre AAA Worldwide (AAA), but also as a freelancer in other Mexican promotions such as International Wrestling Revolution Group, Lucha Memes, and MexaWrestling. Aramís participated in Pro Wrestling Guerrilla's Battle of Los Angeles 2019 event, which was his United States debut. Aramís also makes appearances in MLW, often against rival Arez.

His real name is not a matter of public record, as is often the case with masked wrestlers in Mexico, where their private lives are kept a secret from the wrestling fans.

Championships and accomplishments
Gladiadores Azteca de Lucha Libre Internacional
GALLI Tag Team Championship (1 time, current) - with Arez
International Wrestling Revolution Group
IWRG Intercontinental Tag Team Championship (1 time, current) – with Imposible
IWRG Rey del Aire Championship (1 time)
Lucha Memes / MexaWrestling
Battle of Naucalpan (2019)
Profesionales de Lucha Libre Mexicana
Nuevos Valore tournament (2010)
Promociones Cara Lucha
Bestiario I tournament (2015)
Warrior Wrestling
Warrior Wrestling Lucha Championship (1 time)

Luchas de Apuestas record

Footnotes

References

External links 
 

21st-century professional wrestlers
Living people
Year of birth missing (living people)
Masked wrestlers
Mexican male professional wrestlers
Professional wrestlers from Mexico City
Professional wrestlers from the State of Mexico
Unidentified wrestlers
People from Coacalco de Berriozábal